Social Cognition is a bimonthly peer-reviewed academic journal covering social and cognitive psychology. It was established in 1982 and is published by Guilford Press. It is the official journal of the International Social Cognition Network. The editor-in-chief is Jeffrey Sherman (University of California at Davis).  According to the Journal Citation Reports, the journal has a 2015 impact factor of 1.286.

References

External links

Publications established in 1982
Social psychology journals
Cognitive science journals
English-language journals
Bimonthly journals
Academic journals associated with international learned and professional societies of Europe
Guilford Press academic journals